, also referred to as Japanese Spider-Man, is a Japanese live-action tokusatsu superhero television series produced by Toei Company, loosely based on Marvel Comics' Spider-Man character via a contract that was negotiated by producer Gene Pelc. The series lasted 41 episodes, which aired on Tokyo Channel 12 from May 17, 1978, to March 14, 1979. A theatrical episode was shown in the Toei Manga Matsuri film festival on July 22, 1978. From March 5 to December 24, 2009, Marvel uploaded English subtitled versions of all 41 episodes on their website.

While Toei's version of the character, Takuya Yamashiro/Spider-Man (portrayed by Kōsuke Kayama (Shinji Tōdō)), wore the same costume as his Marvel Comics counterpart, the show's storyline and the origin of the character's powers deviated from the source material. In addition to fighting by himself, this incarnation of Spider-Man piloted a giant mecha known as Leopardon, which he would summon to fight off enlarged versions of the show's monsters. Toei would later adopt the giant robot concept for their Super Sentai franchise. Yamashiro subsequently appeared in the comic storylines Spider-Verse and Spider-Geddon, and will return in Spider-Man: Across the Spider-Verse, the upcoming sequel to Spider-Man: Into the Spider-Verse, set in the Spider-Verse franchise.

Plot 
Young motorcycle racer Takuya  Yamashiro sees a UFO falling to Earth, a space warship named the Marveller. Takuya's father Dr. Hiroshi Yamashiro, a space archaeologist, investigates the case, but is killed upon finding the spaceship. The incident also attracts the attention of Professor Monster and his evil , an alien group that plans to rule the universe.

Takuya follows his father to the Marveller and discovers Garia, the last surviving warrior of Planet Spider, a world that was destroyed by Professor Monster and the Iron Cross Army. Garia explains that he was hunting Prof. Monster but now needs someone to carry on the fight and he injects Takuya with some of his own blood. The blood of a person from Planet Spider gives Takuya spider-like powers. Garia then gives Takuya a bracelet that activates his spider protector costume, shoots web-lines, and controls the Marveller ship (which can also transform into a giant battle robot called "Leopardon"). Using his powers, Takuya fights Professor Monster's army and other threats to Earth under the name Spider-Man.

Characters

Spider-Man 

He has the ability to perceive threats from the Iron Cross Army with his spider-senses. He fights the Iron Cross Army in order to avenge his father's death. To conceal his superhero identity, Takuya acts as a weakling in front of his friends. Takuya gets chastised by his friends whenever he runs away from danger and is often compared unfavorably to Spider-Man. Moreover, his financial income as a motorcycle racer decreases after becoming Spider-Man due to his reduced participation in races, forcing him to assist Hitomi in her job to pay for his expenses.

Takuya assumes the identity of Spider-Man when he dons the protective suit known as the Spider-Protector. He is genetically altered as a result of the Spider-Extract injected into his body by Garia, gaining spider-like abilities such as being able to stick to and climb up walls. He can also detect the activities of nearby enemies with his Spider-Senses, and his physical strength is greater than the average person. However, he has also inherited some of the same weaknesses actual spiders have, such as a strong sensitivity towards cold.

Spider-Man keeps his true identity a secret from the public, although his reputation as a defender of justice is established early on. Spider-Man even gets a hit song named after him called the "Spider-Man Boogie" in Episode 7. Only Juzo Mamiya and the staff of the Interpol Secret Intelligence Division know of Spider-Man's true identity, starting with the movie and every episode in the series from 11 and onward. They cooperate in various instances to thwart the schemes of the Iron Cross Army.

Spider-Man spends most of the series fighting off Ninders (the Iron Cross Army's foot soldiers). He rarely finishes the Machine BEMs by himself, as they usually turn giant, forcing Spider-Man to summon Leopardon. Spider-Man thus occupies a peculiar position in the Japanese superhero genre of having no signature finishing move or weapon, such as Kamen Rider's Rider Kick or Kikaider's Denji End.

When Spider-Man faces the enemy in each episode, he introduces himself while performing a dramatic pose. A version of the show's theme song then plays as background music as Spider-Man begins to fight. The same shot of Spider-Man conducting the pose would be used repeatedly a couple of times before battle. Toei's version of Spider-Man rarely uses his web shooter to swing between buildings, as his main mode of transportation is a car called the Spider Machine GP-7, along with an aircraft called the Marveller. His web shooter instead shoots a rope which he latches onto things and he swings with it using both hands like Tarzan.

Equipment 
  Takuya's Spider-Man costume. Unlike his Marvel counterpart, Takuya keeps his outfit stored inside his Spider Bracelet and wears it only when changing identities. When Takuya releases it from his bracelet, it instantly wraps onto his body, allowing Takuya to change into it easily.
  A bracelet worn around Spider-Man's left wrist, used to shoot webbing and to store the Spider Protector when Takuya is not wearing it. The Spider Bracelet's webbing takes the form of nets and strings made from "Spider Fluid", which is stored within the bracelet and is produced indefinitely. The bracelet is also equipped with a homing device that allows Spider-Man to summon the GP-7 or Marveller. No toy version of the Spider Bracelet was ever made during the run of the show's airing, while related products and manga adaptations omitted the bracelet altogether. A lighter version of the Spider Bracelet prop was built specifically for action scenes, since the one used in close shots was too heavy for the suit actor to wear during stunts.
  A rope made of spider webbing shot from Spider-Man's Spider Bracelet. It can pull objects that weigh more than a hundred tons.
  A net made of spider webbing also shot from Spider-Man's Spider Bracelet. It is used to capture a group of enemies at once.
 The  Spider-Man's flying car. The car is equipped with machine guns and missile launchers inside its bonnet. It is usually stored inside the Marveller aircraft. The name GP-7 is a reference to the name of the American producer Gene Pelc.
 The  The spacecraft that Garia came to Earth with. It is 45 meters (approx 150 feet) tall and weighs over 25,000 tons. It is usually stored underground and surfaces by cracking the ground whenever Spider-Man summons it. The ship's bridge is shaped like a leopard's head, which is where Leopardon's head is stored, and cracks left and right when transforming into robot mode. It is capable of flying to outer space at the speed of light. Because Marveller is usually transformed immediately into Leopardon whenever Spider-Man boards it, it is rarely seen in spacecraft mode. The Marveller is primarily equipped with cannons on its bow, which are capable of destroying most Machine BEMs.

Leopardon 

 is a giant robot that Marveller can transform into. It is over 60 meters (approx. 200 feet) tall and has a weight of over 25,000 tons.

Only the first few episodes of the series featured actual battle scenes between Leopardon and the giant-sized Machine BEMs. As the series progressed the dramatic portions of the episodes were made longer, while battle scenes were made shorter in order to keep up with the running time. Because of this, there were numerous episodes in which Leopardon would throw his sword immediately after transforming from Marveller, finishing off the Machine Bem in a single blow. A few episodes did not even feature Leopardon at all. Leopardon does not suffer any damages, not even during the final battle against the giant version of Professor Monster, who is finished off with the Sword Vigor throw like most of the previous Machine Bems.

Leopardon and the giant-sized Machine Bems rarely appeared together in the same shots; most of the giant-sized battles involved Leopardon in one shot and the Machine BEM in another launching projectiles at each other. This was because the large Leopardon model often dwarfed the stuntmen in the Machine BEM suits. Due to structural problems, the Leopardon suit was difficult for the stuntman to move in and during the course of the series, the suit was damaged and later lost. As a result, all future fight scenes with Leopardon could only be made using stock footage of previous fights.

Allies 
 
 Takuya's girlfriend, a 20-year-old freelance photographer. She is the only main character besides Spider-Man to ride the Spider Machine GP-7.
 
 Takuya's 18-year-old younger sister, who takes care of the household chores for the Yamashiro residence.
 
 Takuya's 7-year-old younger brother.
 
 Takuya's father. An astronomer who is killed during the first episode after his research led to the discovery of the Iron Cross Army.
 
 An alien from Planet Spider. 400 years prior to the events of the first episode, he pursued the Iron Cross Army in search of vengeance after they destroyed his homeworld, but crash-landed into the Earth and was imprisoned in a cave for centuries. He is the one who injects Takuya with the Spider Extract. Garia died in Episode 2.
 
 An investigator in charge of Interpol's Secret Intelligence Division. He manages to uncover the fact that Spider-Man is Takuya and asks for his assistance in their mutual battle against the Iron Cross Army. Upon agreeing, Takuya receives a radio transmitter from him, which allows Spider-Man to rendezvous with Interpol and vice versa.

Iron Cross Army 
The  are the main villains of the series. They are an alien army that has destroyed numerous galaxies in their path of conquest.
 
 The leader of the Iron Cross Army. He was responsible for the destruction of Planet Spider and 400 years later, he seeks to conquer the Earth as well. The blood of other lifeforms serves as the source of his immortality. In the final episode, he enlarges himself and turns into "Big Monster", but is defeated by a single strike of Leopardon's "Sword Vigour" attack. He resembles Doctor Doom though it has never confirmed to be inspired by him.
 
 The female commander of the Iron Cross Army. She is in charge of espionage and the planning of attacks. After Spider-Man sees through Saeko's true identity, she disappears from her job and Weekly Woman is discontinued shortly afterward. Although she suspects that Takuya is really Spider-Man, she is unable to prove this without a doubt until the final episode. Her outfit changes throughout the course of the series: she wears a black leotard with her own natural hair for the first 18 episodes; a silver mini-skirt outfit and a red hairpiece for episodes 19 throughout 30 and 32; the same outfit but with a black hairpiece for episodes 31 and 33 to 38; and her original leotard outfit with a hairpiece for the final three episodes.
 
 Two ancient female warriors from an uncharted region of the Amazons whose mummified bodies were resurrected by Professor Monster. Bella uses a bow with poisoned arrows, while Rita wields a machine-gun.
 
 The foot soldiers of the Iron Cross Army. They disguise themselves as humans while conducting undercover missions in public, but are still identifiable by the exposed circuits behind their ears and their metallic hands.

Machine Bem 
Biological weapons created by the Iron Cross Army. A new  is usually created for each plot, usually to carry out the Iron Cross Army's plans or to serve as a bodyguard. The origins of the Machine Bems are never fully clarified, although a few of them (like Samson) are actually genetically modified humans, while others (like the Monster Cat) were apparitions brought back to life. The Machine Bems have the ability to change size at will, changing not only to giant size, but also to small palm sizes as well (such as the case with Kabuton).

Cast 
 Takuya Yamashiro / Spider-Man: Shinji Tōdō
 Hitomi Sakuma: Rika Miura (episodes 1-12, 14, 15, 17, 18 & 20-41)
 Shinko Yamashiro: Izumi Ōyama (episodes 1-39 & 41)
 Takuji Yamashiro: Yoshiharu Yabuki (ep. 1-16, 18-24, 26, 27, 29-33, 35-39 & 41)
 Professor Monster: Mitsuo Andō (all episodes)
 Amazoness: Yukie Kagawa (all episodes)
 Garia: Toshiaki Nishizawa (episodes 1 & 2)
 Dr. Hiroshi Yamashiro: Fuyuki Murakami (episode 1)
 Jūzō Mamiya: Noboru Nakaya (episodes 11, 12 & 14 & Movie)
 Rita: Rie Rinehart (episodes 35-41)
 Bella: Tina Margo (episodes 35-38) Wanita Somaborudo (episodes 39-41)
 Narrator: Tōru Ōhira
 Spider-Man's suit actor: Hirofumi Koga (all episodes), Ryusuke Sakitsu (episodes 17 & 18)
 Voice of various Machine BEMs: Shōzō Iizuka (episodes 1-7, 13-21, 26 & 28-38 & Movie)
 Voice of various Machine BEMs: Hisako Kyōda (episodes 8 & 23)
 Voice of various Machine BEMs: Shin Aomori (episodes 24 & 25)

Episode list

Production 
The show was the result of a three-year licensing agreement when publisher Gene Pelc visited Japan on the behalf of Marvel that allowed both to use each other's properties in any way they wanted. Toei initially planned to use Spider-Man as a supporting character for an unmade television series starring a fictionalized version of Yamato Takeru who was sent to the present via a time warp. The character who would've appeared on this show was intended to be identical to the Marvel version. However, Toei decided to make Spider-Man the protagonist instead and the character of Yamato Takeru was revised into Garia, an alien who gives Spider-Man his powers. The resulting show deviated from the source material completely, outside of Spider-Man's costume and some of his superpowers and gadgets. Other productions by Toei as a result of this licensing deal included Battle Fever J (a show originally conceived about a Japanese counterpart of Captain America) and an animated television movie based on the comic book Tomb of Dracula. Marvel would use the main robots from two of Toei's anime programs, Wakusei Robo Danguard Ace and Chōdenji Robo Combattler V, in their comic book adaptation of the Shogun Warriors toyline. A toy version of Leopardon, Spider-Man's robot from the Toei series, was also sold in the United States as part of the Godaikin line.

Although the show's story was criticized by some for bearing almost no resemblance to the Marvel version, the staff at Marvel Comics, including Spider-Man's co-creator Stan Lee, praised the show for its special effects and stunt work, especially the spider-like movement of the character himself. While it is said that Marvel initially opposed the addition of Leopardon, the robot was viewed as a necessary gimmick to attract younger viewers and was ultimately kept. The show's mechanical designer, Katsushi Murakami (a toy designer at the time), expressed concern about Toei's capability to market Spider-Man to Japanese audiences and was given permission by producer Yoshinori Watanabe to take whatever liberties he deemed necessary. Murakami came up with the idea of giving Spider-Man an extraterrestrial origin, as well as a spider-like spacecraft that could transform into a giant robot (due to the popularity of the giant robot shows in Japan at the time).

The action figure version of Leopardon was initially sold as a part of the Chogokin toyline and became an unprecedented success in the market, which contributed to the TV series' popularity as well. The success of the show made Toei introduce the giant robot concept to their Super Sentai franchise in Battle Fever J (a show which they also co-produced with Marvel) and contributed to Spider-Man's popularity when Marvel began to export more of their properties to Japan during later years.

The head writer of the series was Shozo Uehara (Gorenger, JAKQ, The Return of Ultraman), who wrote 15 episodes, while Uehara’s Sentai collaborator Susumu Takaku (who was head writer of the show alongside Uehara) wrote 15 episodes and the movie. There were many episodes in which the "monster of the week" (usually a "Machine BEM" created by the villain) was not relevant to the plot, as well as two episodes (ep. 12 and ep. 27) which featured no monsters at all. The show also featured a story arc in which the female antagonist Amazoness tries to uncover Spider-Man's secret identity.

Rather infamously, every time Spider-Man's giant robot finished a monster, it always used the exact same shot only with a new monster composited in, but due to the nature of the splice, the very first monster of the series was always visible very briefly before exploding. This occurred because at some point during filming of the series, the Leopardon suit was stolen from the set; Toei could not afford to make a replacement and opted to splice the existing footage into new episodes instead.

Film 

A theatrical version of Spider-Man was shown on the Toei Manga Matsuri film festival on July 22, 1978. It was directed by series director Kōichi Takemoto and written by Susumu Takaku. The movie was the first appearance of the character of Juzo Mamiya, who subsequently appeared in three episodes of the series (episodes 11, 12 and 14). Because of this, the movie takes place between episodes 10 and 11.

Staff 
 Producer:  (Toei), Hiroshi Ishikawa (Tokyo Channel 12), Gene Pelc
 Creator: Saburo Yatsude (based on the Marvel Comics character Spider-Man created by Stan Lee and Steve Ditko)
 Music composer: Michiaki Watanabe
 Music producer: Andante
 Music performers: Colombia Percussion Ensemble (catalog number: Columbia Record CQ-7010)
 Character designer: Kikakusha 104, Muneo Kubo
 Costume production: Ekisu Production
 Stunt Coordinators: Osamu Kaneda, 
 Special Effects Director:  (uncredited in the show)
 Assistant Directors:  and others
 Producing Companies: Toei, Tokyo Channel 12

Theme songs 
 Opening theme
 
 Lyrics: Saburo Yatsude
 Composition & Arrangement: Michiaki Watanabe (listed as Chumei Watanabe)
 Artist: Yuki Hide
 Ending theme
 
 Lyrics: Saburo Yatsude
 Composition & Arrangement: Michiaki Watanabe (listed as Chumei Watanabe)
 Artist: Yuki Hide

Home media

Because Spider-Man is a Marvel property, Toei was not allowed to rerun the series or use publicity stills of Spider-Man from the show without paying licensing fees to Marvel. Original characters and other elements exclusive to Toei's television series (such as the villains and the giant robot Leopardon), were exempt from these licensing issues, as these were creations of Toei.

As a result, only a single VHS collection of episodes (which featured episodes 1, 31, and the movie) was released in Japan during the 1980s, and reprints of the official soundtrack had the original cover on the jacket replaced with an image of Leopardon. The rest of the series was unavailable on home video for many years. The 1995 superhero guidebook  (published by Takeshobo) was the last time Toei was allowed to publish a photograph of Spider-Man. Every retrospective coverage of Toei's Spider-Man published since then was done without using photographs of the Spider-Man character himself.

In 2004, Toei began renegotiating with Marvel for the rights to release the series on DVD in Japan. The Region 2 DVD box set was released on December 9, 2005, and includes all 41 episodes and the movie on seven discs, as well as a 148-page booklet which features every publicity still of Spider-Man shot for the series. In July 2006, Bandai released a series of toys related to the Toei's Spider-Man TV series, such as the Soul of Chogokin GX-33 Leopardon toy robot (with a Spider-Man figure included), the "Soul of Soft Vinyl" Spider-Man action figure, and a Popynica Spider-Machine GP-7 toy car.

On March 5, 2009, Marvel began broadcasting the series to an international audience for the first time on their video streaming website. A different episode (including the movie version) was uploaded every week until the entire series was available on December 17 of the same year. These episodes were shown in their original Japanese audio with English subtitles. The episodes were later taken down.

Legacy
Spider-Man: The Animated Series (Spider-Man TAS), which ran from 1994 to 1998, drew some influence from Japanese Spider-Man. The writer of Spider-Man TAS, John Semper, found Japanese Spider-Man to be the only previous Spider-Man adaptation that impressed him, as he thought it was a "great" show and "goofy fun". Japanese Spider-Man's giant robot influenced the final multi-part parallel universe arc where Spider-Man's wealthy alter-ego has a robot.

The massive success of the show and the sales for the Leopardon toys inspired Toei to integrate a Giant Robot to their Super Sentai series, which would not only lead it to become one of the most popular Tokusatsu franchises in Japan but also led to the success of Power Rangers.

In other media
Apart from the costume and powers of the main character, this TV series is unrelated to Ryoichi Ikegami's earlier manga adaptation of Spider-Man or the original Spider-Man comics. However, several manga adaptations of the Toei version were published by different magazines, such as TV Land, Tanoshī Yōchien, TV Magazine, and Bōken'ō.

Takuya Yamashiro and Leopardon appeared in several issues of the 2014 and 2018 comic book events Spider-Verse and Spider-Geddon, alongside other alternate universe versions of Spider-Man such as Miles Morales and Miguel O'Hara (Spider-Man 2099), thereby allowing Yamashiro to interact with his fellow Spider-Men for the first time in Marvel canon.

A version of Spider-Man's giant robot, Leopardon, appears in Ernest Cline's novel Ready Player One.

Takuya Yamashiro and Leopardon will appear in Spider-Man: Across the Spider-Verse, with producer Phil Lord confirming on social media that their respective designs for the film had been finalized.

See also

Spider-Man: The Manga
Spider-Man J

References

External links

Spider-Man movie hub at Marvel.com
Toei website

1978 Japanese television series debuts
1979 Japanese television series endings
Spider-Man television series
Television shows based on Marvel Comics
Television series by Disney
Toei tokusatsu
Tokusatsu television series
Transforming heroes
TV Tokyo original programming